Ei Yadanar Phyo (born 4 January 1998) is a Burmese footballer who plays as a defender for the Myanmar women's national team.

See also
List of Myanmar women's international footballers

References

1998 births
Living people
Women's association football defenders
Burmese women's footballers
People from Sagaing Region
Myanmar women's international footballers